HD 96167 is a double star system with an exoplanetary companion in the southern constellation of Crater. The apparent visual magnitude of this system is 8.09, which is too faint to be readily visible to the naked eye. It is located at a distance of approximately 279 light years from the Sun based on parallax, and is drifting further away with a radial velocity of +12 km/s.

The primary component, designated HD 96167 A, is an ordinary G-type main-sequence star with a stellar classification of G5V. It has also been classified as a subgiant star, suggesting it is somewhat more evolved having exhausted the hydrogen at its core. The star has an absolute magnitude of 3.41, placing it about a magnitude above the main sequence. It is metal rich and is around six billion years old. This star is larger, brighter and more massive than the Sun.

A faint co-moving stellar companion, component HD 96167 B, was detected in 2014 at a projected separation 506 AU from the primary. The existence of additional stellar companions was ruled out at projected distances from 51 to 740 astronomical units.

In 2009 it was found that primary star HD 96167 A is orbited by a Jovian planet on an eccentric orbit.

See also
 List of extrasolar planets

References

G-type main-sequence stars
G-type subgiants
Planetary systems with one confirmed planet
Double stars

Crater (constellation)
J11051506-1017286
Durchmusterung objects
096167
054195